Manfred Höner  is a German former football coach.

Höner managed the Nigeria national team from 1987 to 1988, leading the team to second place at the 1988 Africa Cup of Nations, losing to Cameroon in the final. He was head coach when Nigeria made an appearance at the 1988 Summer Olympics. Höner also managed German club Eintracht Trier in 1991.

In 2004, Höner was the technical director of the Qatar Football Association.

Honours
Nigeria
 Africa Cup of Nations runner-up: 1988

References

External links
 Olympedia

Living people
German football managers
1988 African Cup of Nations managers
Nigeria national football team managers
SV Eintracht Trier 05 managers
Oberliga (football) managers
German expatriate football managers
German expatriate sportspeople in Nigeria
Expatriate football managers in Nigeria
Year of birth missing (living people)